Delias dohertyi is a butterfly in the family Pieridae. It was described by Charles Oberthur in 1894. It is found in the Indomalayan realm.

The wingspan is about 55–60 mm. Adults are entirely white on the upperside, with no traces of black apical markings. The hindwings lack the red submarginal line which is usual for the nigrina species group.

Subspecies
Delias dohertyi dohertyi (Jobi)
Delias dohertyi knowlei Joicey & Noakes, 1915 (Biak)

Etymology
The name honours William Doherty.

References

External links
Delias at Markku Savela's Lepidoptera and Some Other Life Forms

dohertyi
Butterflies described in 1894